Frederick Peter "Eric" Cheape (November 23, 1885 – October, 1973) was a college football player.

Sewanee
Cheape was a prominent guard for the Sewanee Tigers football team of Sewanee:The University of the South from 1907 to 1909. He was from Avon Park, Florida.

1907
He was a member of the 1907 team, one of Sewanee's greatest.

1909
He was selected All-Southern in 1909, a year in which Sewanee was conference champion.

References

Sewanee Tigers football players
People from Avon Park, Florida
Players of American football from Florida
All-Southern college football players
American football guards
1885 births
1973 deaths
People from Sewanee, Tennessee